Caelostomus straneoi is a species of ground beetle in the subfamily Pterostichinae. It was described by Darlington in 1962.

References

Caelostomus
Beetles described in 1962